Keiferia griseofusca is a moth in the family Gelechiidae. It was described by Povolný in 1984. It is found in Venezuela.

References

Keiferia
Moths described in 1984